Pukekohe Park is a horse racing, motor racing, and community events facility located in Pukekohe, New Zealand, approximately  south of the Auckland CBD, in the Auckland Region of the North Island. The venue, owned by Counties Racing Club Inc. is used seven days a week for horse training, driver training, motor sport events, cycling and various events and functions.

History
The Raceway was opened in 1963 as a permanent track, replacing Ardmore Aedrorome as the host circuit of the New Zealand Grand Prix. Annually for several years, the mainly European based Grand Prix drivers such as Stirling Moss, Graham Hill, Jim Clark and Jackie Stewart, would head downunder for a relaxed Tasman Series during the European winter.

For many years Pukekohe was the venue for New Zealand's premier production car race, the Benson and Hedges 500 mile race (later 1000 km) featuring drivers such as Peter Brock, Dick Johnson and Jim Richards. In 1996 the New Zealand Mobil Sprints held one round in Pukekohe. Pukekohe Park Raceway also held an annual round of the popular Australian V8 Supercar race from 2001 to 2007. However, the New Zealand round moved to Hamilton Street Circuit in 2008. On 5 July 2012, it was announced that V8 Supercars would return to the circuit in 2013 as part of a 5-year deal with the circuit operators following a series of upgrades to accommodate for the series' return.

The changes to the track included a series of corners before the hairpin turn, meaning safer, slower races. The upgrades also included a new race control building, timing building and corporate viewing facility opposite the main grandstand as well as the addition of overhead pedestrian bridges.

In the centre of the circuit there is a thoroughbred training centre, which dictates the use of the site as it owned by the Counties Racing Club Inc. The club is host to 14 horse race meetings a year and is used six days a week as a stables and training facility.

On 20 July 2022, Pukekohe Park announced that it would cease hosting motorsport events on 3 April 2023, citing a desire to focus on its horse racing events and club facilities.

On 8 September 2022, iRacing announced that Pukekohe Park would be laser scanned and digitally preserved for sim racing after an online petition was launched. Over 7,000 digital signatures were collected and the petition gathered support from the "King of Pukekohe" Greg Murphy and three-time Supercars champion Scott McLaughlin, both former Supercars race winners at Pukekohe.

Layout history

New Zealand Grand Prix

The New Zealand Grand Prix has been held at Pukekohe on 29 occasions, the first being in 1963, and the last to date being held in 2000. Between 1964 and 1975, the NZ Grand Prix at the circuit was also a round of the Tasman Series. Winners of the NZ Grand Prix at Pukekohe include Kiwis Bruce McLaren, Chris Amon, Craig Baird, and Paul Radisich, internationals such as Australian Frank Gardner, Italian Teo Fabi, and Brazilian Roberto Moreno, as well as Formula One World Champions John Surtees, Graham Hill, Jackie Stewart and Keke Rosberg (Rosberg's wins in 1977 and 1978 were before his World Championship win in ).

Supercars Championship

In 2008 the Supercars Championship round in New Zealand moved to the Hamilton Street Circuit so Pukekohe held its final event on the weekend of 20–22 April 2007. In 2013 Supercars returned to Pukekohe after the Auckland government confirmed that stakeholders would put $6.6 million into making the circuit more suitable for Supercars. These upgrades include a new chicane on the back straight, more pedestrian bridges and a makeover of the circuit's appearance.

Lap records

The official race lap records at the Pukekohe Park Raceway are listed as:

Notes

References

External links
Pukekohe Park 
Official Website of V8 race 
NZV8s' Pukekohe Park Raceway info 
2012 Upgrades (for April 2013 V8 Supercars)

Motorsport venues in New Zealand
Supercars Championship circuits
New Zealand Grand Prix
2023 disestablishments in New Zealand